Pseudoplexaura is a genus of gorgonian-type octocorals in the family Plexauridae. They form tall, branching, tree-like colonies and are native to reefs in the Caribbean Sea and the Gulf of Mexico.

Species
The World Register of Marine Species lists the following species:

Pseudoplexaura crucis Bayer, 1961
Pseudoplexaura flagellosa (Houttuyn, 1772)
Pseudoplexaura porosa (Houttuyn, 1772)
Pseudoplexaura wagenaari (Stiasny, 1941)

Uses
Pseudoplexaura spp. can be kept in a reef aquarium. They grow vigorously and detached branches can be used to propagate new colonies.

References

Plexauridae
Octocorallia genera